Kundavai Pirattiyar, commonly known mononymously as Kundavai, was a princess of the Chola empire who lived in the tenth century in South India. She was the daughter of Parantaka II and Vanavan Mahadevi. She was born in Tirukoilur and was the elder sister of Chola emperor Rajaraja I. She had title as Ilaiyapirātti Kundavai Nachiyar.

However when her husband Vallavaraiyan Vandiyadevan was crowned king in his hometown Bana Kingdom, she did not accept the offer to become queen of the kingdom and remained as the princess of Tanjore.

Life 
Kundavai (also transliterated as Kundhavai or Kunthavai) was born in 945 CE. She was the only daughter of the Chola king Parantaka II and queen Vanavan Mahadevi. She had an elder brother –  Aditha Chola II, and a younger brother – Raja Raja cholan I.

Kundavai married Vallavaraiyan Vandiyadevan, a member of the Bana Dynasty, a feudatory of the Cholas mentioned in the Tanjore inscriptions. He was also the commander of the Chola infantry that fought in Sri Lanka in the days of Rajaraja l. The territory under his authority was known as 'Vallavaraiyanadu', and occasionally 'Brahmadesam'.

Along with her great-aunt Sembiyan Mahadevi, Kundavai brought up her nephew, Rajendra I, who was the son of Rajaraja I and Thiripuvana Madeviyar, princess of Kodumbalur. Rajendra I spent most of his childhood in  Pazhaiyarai with Kundavai and Sembiyan Mahadevi.

In popular culture 
Kundavai is celebrated as mentor to Rajaraja I. Her influence continued into the next generation as she helped rear Rajendra Chola. Uniquely for her era, where royal women were used to forge alliances, Kundavai's father allowed her to exercise her free will, whereupon the princess resolved to stay in the Chola kingdom all her life. Esteemed throughout the Chola realm for her taste and learning, Kundavai was requested to look after the daughters of other royal clans, tutoring them in art, music, and literature.

Life and works 

Kundavai commissioned many temples for Jain, Vishnu and Siva . She features in Chola inscriptions.

She built at least two Jain temples, one at Rajarajeswaram later known as Darasuram and the other at Tirumalai. She built a hospital after her father named Vinnagar athura salai at Thanjavur and donated extensive lands for its maintenance. She made lavish donations to the Brihadeeswarar Temple at Thanjavur during the reign of her younger brother Rajaraja Chola I and her nephew Rajendra Chola I.

One of the inscriptions reads:

 Some of the images or idols set up by princess Kundavai include:

Here is an excerpt from the 29th year of Rajaraja that lists some of her gifts to Brihadeeswarar Temple:

Kundavai spent the last days of her life with her nephew Rajendra I at the palace in Pazhaiyarai.

In popular culture 

 Ponniyin Selvan a 1955 historical fiction novel by Kalki Krishnamurthy revolves around the early days of Rajaraja, the mysteries surrounding the assassination of Aditha Karikalan and the subsequent accession of Uttama to the Chola throne.
 Indian actor Trisha played her role in Mani Ratnam's 2022 film Ponniyin Selvan: I which is based on Kalki's novel.

See also 

 Ponniyin Selvan
 Ponniyin Selvan: I

References

Further reading
 Great women of India By Madhavananda (Swami.), Ramesh Chandra Majumdar
 Lalit kalā, Issue 15, Lalit Kalā Akademi., 1972
 Middle Chola temples: Rajaraja I to Kulottunga I (A.D. 985–1070) By S. R. Balasubrahmanyam, Oriental Press, 1977
 Śrīnidhiḥ: perspectives in Indian archaeology, art, and culture By K. R. Srinivasan, K. V. Raman
 Encyclopaedia of Jainism, Volume 1 By Indo-European Jain Research Foundation
 Portrait sculpture in south India By T. G. Aravamuthan
 Ancient system of oriental medicine By S.P. Verma
 Worshiping Śiva in medieval India: ritual in an oscillating universe By Richard H. Davis
 Women in Indian life and society By Amitābha Mukhopādhyāẏa
 A Topographical List of Inscriptions in the Tamil Nadu and Kerala States, Volume 7, T. V. Mahalingam, Indian Council of Historical Research, 1985
 Śāṅkaram: recent researches on Indian culture By S. Sankaranarayanan, S. S. Ramachandra Murthy, B. Rajendra Prasad, D. Kiran Kranth Choudary
 South Indian inscriptions: Volume 2, Parts 1–2 By Eugen Hultzsch, India. Archaeological Survey, India. Dept. of Archaeology
 Encyclopaedia of Status and Empowerment of Women in India: Status and position of women in ancient, medieval and modern India By Raj Pruthi, Rameshwari Devi, Romila Pruthi

Chola dynasty
Indian queen consorts
Tamil history
Year of death missing
10th-century Hindus
10th-century Indian women
10th-century Indian people